Wang Jiadao (1916–1992) was a People's Liberation Army major general and People's Republic of China politician. He was born in Huoqiu County, Anhui Province. As a member of the Chinese Workers' and Peasants' Red Army, he participated in the Long March. During the Second Sino-Japanese War, he was part of the Eighth Route Army. In March 1969, he was involved in the Sino-Soviet border conflict. In 1971, he was made Governor and Chinese Communist Party Committee Secretary of Heilongjiang Province after the dismissal of Pan Fusheng.

References
山东省地方史志编篡委员会. 《山东省志: 军事志,》. 山东人民出版社. 1996年: 346页.
王中兴, 刘立勤. 《第二野战军》. 国防大学出版社. 1996年: 14页. .
王年一. 《大动乱的年代: 『文化大革命』十年史》. 河南人民出版社. 1988年: 188页.

1916 births
1992 deaths
People's Republic of China politicians from Anhui
Chinese Communist Party politicians from Anhui
People's Liberation Army generals from Anhui
Governors of Heilongjiang
Alternate members of the 9th Central Committee of the Chinese Communist Party
Alternate members of the 10th Central Committee of the Chinese Communist Party
Politicians from Lu'an
Deputy commanders of the Shenyang Military Region
CCP committee secretaries of Heilongjiang
People from Huoqiu County